Iqbal Riza (EEK-bahl Ree-zah) (born 20 May 1934 in Lonavla, India) is a retired Pakistani diplomat. He is currently a special adviser to the Secretary-General of the United Nations, and has worked for Spanish Foundation Concordia 21. He served as the Chef de Cabinet (Chief of Staff) to United Nations Secretary-General Kofi Annan from his appointment at the beginning of Annan's term in January 1997 until his retirement January 15, 2005.

Previously, he acted as Assistant Secretary-General in the Department of Peacekeeping Operations starting March 1993. During this time, from 1996 to 1997, he also concurrently served as Special Representative of the Secretary-General and Chief of the United Nations Mission in Bosnia and Herzegovina (UNMIBH).  Earlier, from 1991 to 1993, he was Special Representative of the Secretary-General and Chief of the United Nations Observer Mission in El Salvador (ONUSAL).

In addition, he served in various capacities within the United Nations, including Chief of Mission of the United Nations Transition Team in El Salvador (March–August 1990), Chief of the United Nations Observer Mission for verification of the electoral process in Nicaragua (ONUVEN) (August 1989 - February 1990), Director of the Division for Political and General Assembly Affairs (1988–1989), Director of the Office for Special Political Affairs (1983–1988), Principal Officer in the United Nations Department of Public Information (1980–1982), and Secretary of the Committee on the Exercise of the Inalienable Rights of the Palestinian People (1978–1980).

Briefly before the genocide in Rwanda, in January and February 1994, Riza played a controversial role as he and Kofi Annan (who directed the UN peacekeeping operations) rejected or ignored continuous requests of the Canadian commander of UNAMIR, Roméo Dallaire, for a more active role of the UN peacekeeping troops UNAMIR in order to prevent a bloodshed. In Rwanda, approximately 800,000 people have been killed within 100 days.

Prior to joining the United Nations, Riza received a graduate degree from the Fletcher School of Law and Diplomacy and served with Pakistan's Foreign Service from 1958 to 1977.

References
 "Annan announces retirement of long-time senior advisor Iqbal Riza".  UN News Center. December 22, 2004.

External links
 Biography United Nations News Center

Living people
1934 births
Muhajir people
Pakistani diplomats
Pakistani officials of the United Nations